Velykyi Zhytyn is a village in the Ukrainian Rivne Oblast with about 1200 inhabitants (2006).

The village was mentioned in 1518 in an act of the King of Poland Sigismund I the Old. In this act, he confirmed his rights over the estates of Prince Kostiantin Ivanovich Ostrozky, inherited from his wife's grandmotherMaria Rivne-Nesvitskayaand her husband Prince Semyon Nesvitsky.

It is located in Rivne Raion on the regional road P-5 and P-77 9 km northeast of the oblast and Raion seat Rivne. The Kustinka River, a tributary of the Horyn, flows through the village.

The first Ukrainian  president, Leonid Kravchuk, was born in Velykyi Zhytyn in 1934. At that time, the village was part of the Second Polish Republic.

References

Rivne Raion
Villages in Rivne Raion